A. J. Preller (born June 20, 1977) is the president of baseball operations and general manager of the San Diego Padres of Major League Baseball (MLB). He was hired by the Padres on August 5, 2014 while serving as the assistant GM for the Texas Rangers, overseeing the player development and scouting departments and serving as a key advisor on all player acquisitions. At the time, he was 36 years old.

Early years
Preller was born in 1977 to parents Arthur and Joan. He grew up on Long Island, New York, and went to school in South Huntington, New York, where in 1995 he graduated from Walt Whitman High School. He attended Cornell University, where he met Jon Daniels, and graduated summa cum laude with a B.S. degree in 1999. After graduation, he served as an intern with the Philadelphia Phillies before joining the front office of the Los Angeles Dodgers, and also worked for Major League Baseball.

Front office career

Texas Rangers
In 2004, Preller was hired as Director of International and Professional Scouting by the Texas Rangers.  While at Cornell, he was a fraternity brother of Texas Rangers General Manager Jon Daniels.  Preller reached the position of Assistant GM, before being hired by the San Diego Padres.

San Diego Padres
On August 6, 2014, the Padres announced the hiring of Preller as their new general manager.  His hiring concluded a six-week process that commenced on June 22 after San Diego dismissed Josh Byrnes following a two and a half years tenure. The Padres also interviewed Kim Ng, Billy Eppler, and Mike Hazen. His official title is the President of Baseball Operations and the General Manager of the Padres.  Preller reportedly agreed to a five-year deal upon joining the Padres organization. He made numerous transactions over the 2014-2015 offseason in what came to be known as "Prellerpalooza." He traded Yasmani Grandal to the Los Angeles Dodgers for Matt Kemp and Tim Federowicz. He partook in a three team trade for Wil Myers and Ryan Hanigan, surrendering five players (including Trea Turner) in the process. He traded prospects to the Braves for Justin Upton. He signed James Shields to a 4-year contract. He made several smaller moves as well, as he launched the Padres into playoff talks before the season began. He concluded the offseason by trading for Braves closer Craig Kimbrel just hours before the season opened on April 5.

Despite his off-season trades, the Padres in June 2015 were still underperforming. This was one of many factors that led to the firing of manager, Bud Black, on June 15, 2015.

On September 15, 2016, Preller was suspended for 30 days by MLB without pay for failing to disclose medical information, regarding the trade that sent Drew Pomeranz to the Red Sox.

On December 3, 2017, Preller was given a 3-year extension to remain as the Padres general manager.

In 2018, MLB Pipeline ranked the Padres farm system No. 1 with seven prospects among their top 100 prospects: Fernando Tatís Jr. (No. 8), MacKenzie Gore (No. 19), Luis Urías (No. 36), Cal Quantrill (No. 40), Michel Báez (No. 42), Adrian Morejón (No. 50), and Anderson Espinoza (No. 89).

On February 19, 2018, the Padres signed Eric Hosmer to an eight-year, $144 million contract, the largest in club history at the time. On February 21, 2019, the Padres signed Manny Machado to a 10-year, $300 million contract, at the time the biggest free-agent contract in the history of American sports.

In 2020, the Padres went 37–23, finishing with a winning record for the first time since 2010. They went on to the playoffs, marking their first postseason appearance since 2006 and defeated the St. Louis Cardinals in the 2020 National League Wild Card Series, their first postseason series win since the 1998 NLCS.

On February 2, 2021, the Padres extended Preller through the 2026 season and promoted him to president of baseball operations. On February 17, the Padres extended Tatís Jr. to a 14-year, $340 million contract, at the time the third-biggest deal in MLB history.

References

External links
San Diego Padres bio

1977 births
Cornell University alumni
Living people
Los Angeles Dodgers executives
Major League Baseball central office executives
Major League Baseball general managers
People from Long Island
Philadelphia Phillies personnel
San Diego Padres executives
Sportspeople from New York (state)
Texas Rangers executives